Juan Moscoso del Prado Hernández (born 5 July 1966 in Pamplona) is a Spanish economist and politician. He was elected to the Spanish Congress of Deputies in 2004 representing Navarre for the PSOE. He was re-elected in 2008 and 2011.

He has a doctorate in economics and business administration from the Autonomous University of Madrid and a master's degree in European economic studies from the College of Europe.

He is the son of former Spanish government minister Javier Moscoso.

References

1966 births
Autonomous University of Madrid alumni
College of Europe alumni
Spanish economists
Living people
Members of the 8th Congress of Deputies (Spain)
Members of the 9th Congress of Deputies (Spain)
Members of the 10th Congress of Deputies (Spain)
Spanish Socialist Workers' Party politicians
People from Pamplona
Politicians from Navarre